The 1922 All-Ireland Senior Hurling Championship Final was the 35th All-Ireland Final and the culmination of the 1922 All-Ireland Senior Hurling Championship, an inter-county hurling tournament for the top teams in Ireland. The match was held at Croke Park, Dublin, on 9 September 1923, between Kilkenny and Tipperary. The Munster champions lost to their Leinster opponents on a score line of 4-2 to 2-6.

Kilkenny would not beat Tipperary in the championship again until the All-Ireland final of 1967.

Match details

References

1
All-Ireland Senior Hurling Championship Finals
Kilkenny GAA matches
Tipperary GAA matches
All-Ireland Senior Hurling Championship Final
All-Ireland Senior Hurling Championship Final, 1922